The Aldebaran class was a class of three frigates/corvettes/destroyer escorts operated by the Italian Navy. They entered service in 1951, with the last one being decommissioned in 1976.

History 
These ships in the United States Navy were classified as destroyer escorts and belonged to the Cannon class, built in large series during the Second World War and then supplied in several different marine units (Mutual Defense Assistance Program).

The three ships entered service in the Navy together with the Artigliere-class units as part of a naval upgrade program started in 1950; they were first used as escorts, from 1957 as frigates and from 1962 as corvettes, a role held until the moment of decommissioning.

Units of this class take their names from three Spica-class torpedo boats lost during World War II.

Ships in the class

Citations 

Frigate classes
Cannon-class destroyer escorts of the Italian Navy